Eslamabad (Shahsaltaneh) (also Romanized as Eslāmābād) is a village in Shapur Rural District, in the Central District of Kazerun County, Fars Province, Iran. At the 2006 census, its population was 689, in 134 families.

References 

Populated places in Kazerun County